DXCL may refer to:
 DXCL-AM, an AM radio station broadcasting in Cagayan de Oro, Philippines
 DXCL-FM, an FM radio station broadcasting in Dipolog, Philippines